Jackie Berroyer (born 24 May 1946) is a French actor, comedian and writer.

Filmography

References

External links

1946 births
Living people
French male film actors
French male television actors
20th-century French male actors
21st-century French male actors
Writers from Reims
Actors from Reims